Norman Mack Van Brocklin (March 15, 1926 – May 2, 1983), nicknamed "the Dutchman", was an American professional football player and coach who played in the National Football League (NFL) for 12 seasons. He played quarterback, spending his first nine seasons with the Los Angeles Rams and his final three with the Philadelphia Eagles. Following his playing career, he was the inaugural head coach of the Minnesota Vikings from 1961 to 1966 and the second head coach of the Atlanta Falcons from 1968 to 1974.

Van Brocklin received All-American honors at Oregon, but was not selected by the Rams until the fourth round of the 1949 NFL Draft due to concerns over his professional availability. During his first three seasons, he and teammate Bob Waterfield alternated as the starting quarterback, culminating with them leading Los Angeles to victory in the 1951 championship. After Waterfield retired, Van Brocklin served as the Rams' primary starter from 1952 to 1957, concluding his tenure with six consecutive Pro Bowl selections and a passing-yards leading season in 1954. He joined Philadelphia in 1958, where his three seasons all saw him receive further Pro Bowl selections, bringing his total to nine. In his final season, he was named Most Valuable Player en route to winning the 1960 championship.

As the head coach of the expansion Vikings and Falcons, Van Brocklin had less success and was unable to reach the postseason with either team. Nevertheless, he recorded the first winning seasons for both franchises. He was inducted to the College Football Hall of Fame in 1966 and the Pro Football Hall of Fame in 1971.

Early life
Born in Parade, South Dakota, Van Brocklin was one of nine children of Mack and Ethel Van Brocklin. His father was a watchmaker. The family moved to Northern California and settled in Walnut Creek, east of Oakland. Van Brocklin was a three-sport standout at Acalanes High School in Lafayette, where he quarterbacked the football team to a 5–3 record as a sophomore and a 4-2-2 record as a junior. He served in the U.S. Navy from 1943 through 1945, foregoing his senior year of high school.

College career
Following World War II, Van Brocklin followed two former high school teammates north and enrolled at the University of Oregon in Eugene. He became the starting quarterback in 1947 under first-year head coach Jim Aiken, and led the Ducks to a 16–5 record in his two seasons as a starter. In 1948, Oregon tied with California for the title of the Pacific Coast Conference, forerunner of the Pac-12. California was undefeated overall, and Oregon's only loss was at undefeated Michigan, that year's national champions, and the Ducks had seven victories in the PCC to Cal's six. Oregon did not go to the Rose Bowl, however, because Cal was voted by the other schools to represent the PCC in the game. Oregon needed only a 5–5 tie vote, as Cal had been to the game more recently, and with six Northwest schools and four in California, appeared favored to advance. Oregon had opted for a playoff game, but California declined. Among the Cal voters was the University of Washington, which elevated the intensity of the Oregon-Washington rivalry. Breaking with tradition, the PCC allowed Oregon to accept an invitation to play SMU in the Cotton Bowl in Dallas. It was the first time that a Pacific Coast team played in a major bowl game other than the Rose Bowl (a policy which was continued by the Pac-8 through 1974). Both Oregon and California lost their New Year's Day bowl games. That season, Van Brocklin was honored with an All-America selection and finished sixth in the Heisman Trophy voting. Coincidentally, the Heisman Trophy winner that year was SMU running back Doak Walker. Both Walker and Van Brocklin got Outstanding Player recognition for their performance in the Cotton Bowl Classic.

Van Brocklin left Oregon for the NFL with one remaining year of college eligibility. At that time, a player was not allowed to join the NFL until four years after graduating from high school. Though he had only been at the University of Oregon for three years, he was eligible due to his time in the Navy during World War II. At age 23, he completed his bachelor's degree in June 1949.

Professional playing career

Los Angeles Rams
Van Brocklin was selected 37th overall in the 1949 NFL Draft, taken in the fourth round by the Los Angeles Rams. Teams were not sure if he planned to play the 1949 season in college or not, so he fell in the draft, conducted in December 1948. Van Brocklin signed with the Rams in July and joined a team that already had a star quarterback, Bob Waterfield.  Beginning in 1950, new Rams coach Joe Stydahar solved his problem by platooning Waterfield and Van Brocklin.  The 1950 Rams scored a then-record 466 points (38.8 per game – which is still a record) with a high octane passing attack featuring Tom Fears and Elroy "Crazy Legs" Hirsch.  Fears led the league and set a new NFL record with 84 receptions.  Van Brocklin and Waterfield finished 1–2 in passer rating as well.  They were defeated by the Cleveland Browns in the 1950 title game, 30–28.

In 1951, Van Brocklin and Waterfield again split quarterbacking duties and the Rams again won the West.  That year, Hirsch set an NFL record with 1,495 receiving yards and tied Don Hutson's record of 17 touchdown receptions.  This time, the Rams won the title rematch against Cleveland, 24–17.  Waterfield (9-24, 125 yards) took most of the snaps at the L.A. Coliseum, but Van Brocklin (4-6, 128 yards) threw a game-winning 73-yard touchdown pass to Fears. It was the Rams' only NFL championship while originally based in southern California; their next came in 1999, several years after the move east to St. Louis. After returning to Los Angeles for the 2016 season, the Rams subsequently won Super Bowl LVI in 2022.

Earlier in 1951 on opening night, Van Brocklin threw for an NFL record 554 yards on September 28, breaking Johnny Lujack's single-game record of 468 set two years earlier. Waterfield was injured so Van Brocklin played the entire game and completed 27 of 41 attempts with five touchdowns.  Despite the increase in passing attacks by NFL teams in recent years, the yardage record still stands, set .

Waterfield retired after the 1952 season and Van Brocklin continued to quarterback the Rams, leading them to the title game again in 1955, hosted at the L.A. Coliseum. In that game, the visiting Browns crushed the Rams 38-14 as Van Brocklin threw six interceptions. In early January 1958, he announced his retirement from pro football after nine seasons and had plans to enter private business in Oregon at Portland.

Philadelphia Eagles
Less than five months later in late May, Van Brocklin changed his mind and was traded to the Philadelphia Eagles for two players (offensive lineman Buck Lansford and defensive end Jimmy Harris) and a first round draft pick. It was disclosed he did not want to play another season for the Rams under head coach Sid Gillman's offense, but it was not a personality issue with Gillman. Under famed head coach Buck Shaw, Van Brocklin was given total control of the offense in Philadelphia in 1958, and he steadily improved the Eagles' attack.  In his third and final season with Philly in 1960, the team had the best regular season record in league at 10–2, and hosted the Green Bay Packers in the NFL Championship Game at Franklin Field. Throwing to his favorite receiver,   Tommy McDonald, Van Brocklin led the Eagles to victory. In a game dominated by defense, he led a fourth quarter comeback, resulting in a final score of 17–13.

During his twelve-year career, Van Brocklin played on two NFL championship teams: the 1951 Los Angeles Rams and the 1960 Philadelphia Eagles.  Following the latter triumph, he retired.  As it turned out, the Eagles were the only team to defeat the Packers in a playoff game during Vince Lombardi's tenure as Green Bay's head coach. Van Brocklin led the NFL in passing three times and in punting twice.  On nine occasions, he was selected to the Pro Bowl.

Coaching career

Minnesota Vikings

Van Brocklin cut his ties with the Eagles after his belief that the team had reneged on an agreement to name him head coach to replace the retiring Buck Shaw. On January 18, 1961, he accepted the head coaching position for the expansion Minnesota Vikings, less than a month after winning the NFL Championship game. During his six years with Minnesota, Van Brocklin compiled a record of 29-51-4. The tenure was highlighted by his contentious relationship with quarterback Fran Tarkenton. Van Brocklin was displeased with Tarkenton's penchant for scrambling, preferring that he stay in the pocket.  The feud culminated with Tarkenton's demand for a trade and Van Brocklin's surprise resignation on February 11, 1967. Tarkenton was traded to the New York Giants shortly after Van Brocklin's departure, but was reacquired by Van Brocklin's successor, Bud Grant, five years later in 1972.  One thing Van Brocklin was known for was his disdain for soccer-style kickers (now the standard in the NFL). In one game, soccer-style kicker Garo Yepremian beat Van Brocklin's team and after the game, a reporter asked about how felt about losing the game on a last-second field goal, and he replied "They ought to change the god-damned immigration laws in this country".

During his first year off the field in over two decades, Van Brocklin served as a commentator on NFL broadcasts in 1967 for CBS.

Atlanta Falcons
In 1968, Van Brocklin took over as head coach of the Atlanta Falcons on October 1, replacing Norb Hecker, who had started the season with three defeats, extending the team losing streak to ten games. Over the next seven seasons, Van Brocklin had mixed results, putting together a 37-49-3 mark.  He led the team to its first winning season in 1971 with a 7-6-1 record, then challenged for a playoff spot in 1973 with a 9–5 mark. His 1973 Falcons handed the Fran Tarkenton-led, 9-0 Minnesota Vikings its first defeat, on Monday Night Football.  However, after winning just two of his first eight games in 1974, he was fired.

Head coaching record

Final years
Following his dismissal, Van Brocklin returned to his pecan farm in Social Circle, Georgia, east of Atlanta. His only connections to football during this era were as a running backs coach for Georgia Tech under head coach Pepper Rodgers in 1979, who was fired that December. It was his only stint as an assistant coach. Rodgers's successor Bill Curry brought in a new staff in 1980 and Van Brocklin then was a college football analyst on "Superstation" WTBS in Atlanta.

Van Brocklin, a heavy cigarette smoker, suffered a number of illnesses, including a brain tumor.  After it was removed, he told the press, "It was a brain transplant. They gave me a sportswriter's brain, to make sure I got one that hadn't been used." He died of a heart attack in 1983 at age 57, five weeks after former teammate Bob Waterfield.

Van Brocklin was posthumously elected to the University of Oregon Athletics Hall of Fame in 1992.

NFL career statistics

NFL records
 1st NFL player to throw over 500 yards : (554) September 28, 1951
 Most yards passed in a single game : 554

See also
 List of 500-yard passing games in the National Football League

References

External links
 
 
 
 

1926 births
1983 deaths
American football punters
American football quarterbacks
American people of Dutch descent
Atlanta Falcons coaches
Atlanta Falcons head coaches
College Football Hall of Fame inductees
Eastern Conference Pro Bowl players
Georgia Tech Yellow Jackets football coaches
Los Angeles Rams players
Minnesota Vikings coaches
National Football League announcers
National Football League general managers
National Football League Most Valuable Player Award winners
New Orleans Saints announcers
Oregon Ducks football players
People from Dewey County, South Dakota
Philadelphia Eagles players
Players of American football from South Dakota
Pro Football Hall of Fame inductees
United States Navy personnel of World War II
Western Conference Pro Bowl players
Minnesota Vikings head coaches